Markia hystrix is a species of katydid in the subfamily Phaneropterinae. It occurs in South America.  A common name for it is the lichen katydid, as it lives surrounded by Usnea lichen on which it sustains itself.

References

Phaneropterinae
Orthoptera of South America
Insects described in 1844